The Eckbach Mill Path is a footpath in the German state of Rhineland-Palatinate. It is 23 kilometres long and runs gently downhill along the Eckbach river through the Leiningerland in the northeast of the Palatinate region.

Course 

The trail runs from west to east/northeast through the collective municipalities of Hettenleidelheim and Grünstadt-Land. It links nine villages and 23 of the original 35 water mills, running from the Palatinate Forest through the vineyards along the German Wine Road to the edge of the Upper Rhine Plain. The height difference between the start and end points (Hertlingshausen 308 metres, Dirmstein 108 metres) is 200 metres, the cumulative gain and loss over the generally gently descending route is only 250 metres, hence its difficulty is assessed as easy.

The route, which is accessible all year round, is marked by wooden signposts, made and maintained by voluntary workers. They bear the mill logo and the name Eckbach-Mühlenwanderweg. The logo depicts a house and waterwheel above a wavy line and was designed by Cosmas Kösters from Kirchheim in a school competition. The wavy line symbolizes the Eckbach, the stylized house with a water wheel represents a mill.

History 
The path was created as a tourist attraction initiative of mill researcher, Wolfgang Niederhöfer, from Kleinkarlbach. On 12 October 1997 it was inaugurated by the minister president of Rhineland-Palatinate, Kurt Beck, in Großkarlbach, the village with the most surviving mills (six of seven). The suggestion made at the time to make the Großkarlbacher village mills a cultural monument and create the Leiningerland Mill Museum (Mühlenmuseum Leiningerland) was achieved in 2007.

Originally the route began by the Eckbachweiher pond and was only 19 kilometres long, but in 2000 it was extended by 4 kilometres upstream to the source of the Eckbach in Hertlingshausen.

Places and mills 
 Hertlingshausen
 Altleiningen
 Neuleiningen-Tal
 Obermühle ("Upper Mill")
 Felsenmühle ("Rock Mill")
 Kleinkarlbach
  Walkmühle ("Waulk Mill")
 Wiesenmühle ("Pastureland Mill")
 Bann- and Backmühle 
 Strohmühle ("Straw Mill")
 Schleifmühle ("Grinding Mill")
 Langmühle ("Long Mill")
 Kirchheim an der Weinstraße
  Kandelmühle or Oligmühle 
 Eselsmühle ("Donkey Mill")
 Kochsche Mühle (locally known as the Gräfliche Leininger Mühle, "Leiningen Comital Mill")
 Bissersheim
  Bruchmühle 
 Haldmühle ("Mill in the Hollow")
 Bergmühle ("Hill Mill")
 Großkarlbach
  Mühle am Weiher ("Mill by the Pond")
 Schlossmühle
 Rheinmühle ("Rhine Mill")
 Village mills
 Pappelmühle ("Poplar Mill")
 Heckmühle 
 Laumersheim
  Weidenmühle ("Meadow Mill")
 Hornungsmühle 
 Dirmstein
  Spormühle
Footnotes to the list:

References

Literature

External links 

 Description
 Map (pdf; 306 kB)
 Pfälzer Festgedicht zur Eröffnung 1997

Hiking trails in Rhineland-Palatinate
Buildings and structures in Bad Dürkheim (district)
Watermills in Germany
Palatinate (region)
Culture of the Palatinate (region)